Martingrove Collegiate Institute (MCI), also referred to as Martingrove, is a semestered public secondary school in Etobicoke, Toronto, Ontario, Canada. It opened in 1966 and is currently overseen by the Toronto District School Board.

Academics

Gifted Program
Martingrove is currently one of two TDSB designated high schools for the Gifted Program in Etobicoke (the other being Thistletown Collegiate Institute).

AP & Pre-AP Program
Martingrove offers the Advanced Placement Program and Pre-AP Program to its students. The Pre-AP Program begins in Grade 9 and continues through Grade 11, and is meant to teach students the necessary skills, knowledge, and foundations for success in preparation for entrance to the Advanced Placement Program in grade 12.

Extracurricular Activities

Reach for the Top
Martingrove has a history of participation in the high school quiz program Reach for the Top. They have won numerous local, regional and provincial tournaments, with appearances at both the provincial and national level finals. They have qualified for the national level finals for 8 years straight as of 2018.

Notable Victories:
 2013 - Ontario Provincial Champions
 2014 - Canadian National Champions
 2015 - Ontario Provincial Champions
 2016 - Ontario Provincial Champions

Model United Nations
Martingrove is host to one of the largest Model United Nations in Ontario, Martingrove Model United Nations, running the annual 2-day event since 1986. The event draws on hundreds of students across the Toronto District School Board, as well as notable guest speakers such as Bob Rae (former Ontario Premier), Allan Rock (former Justice Minister),  Jean Chrétien (former Canadian Prime Minister), and Elizabeth Dowdeswell (current Lieutenant Governor of Ontario).

School Newspaper
Martingrove's student-run news magazine is called The Martingrove Beacon. It was created in 2002 and since then has won 15 Toronto Star high school newspaper awards.

Notable alumni
 Tom Cochrane, Musician
 Daniel DeSanto, Actor (Half Baked, Are You Afraid of the Dark?, Mean Girls, Breakaway)
 Bruce Driver, Former NHL Hockey Player and Stanley Cup champion (New Jersey Devils)
 Kiefer Sutherland, Actor (24, The Lost Boys, A Time to Kill)
 Denis McGrath, Screenwriter and producer.
 Ravi Vakil, Professor of Mathematics, Stanford University.
 Heather MacLean, an Olympic Swimmer on the Swim Relay Squad in London, 2012.
 Nathan Cullen, Canadian Federal politician in the New Democratic Party
 Basia Bulat, Musician
 Brad Giffen, Former News Anchor/Reporter (ABC, CTV,  CITY-TV / Host-Toronto Rocks)
 Malcolm Subban, NHL goalie for the Buffalo Sabres.
 Mark Ellis, co-creator, Executive Producer of Flashpoint and  X-Company
 Keith Pelley, sports executive, CEO of the PGA European Tour, former presidents of Rogers Media, Toronto Argonauts and TSN.
 Frank Morrone, audio engineer, Canadian Screen Award winner for The Book of Negroes, Emmy award winner.
 Matthew Wright, Basketball Player (Phoenix Fuel Masters, Philippines National Team)
 Ed Iacobucci, Dean and Professor of Law, Faculty of Law, University of Toronto
 Claire Thompson, hockey player for the Canadian Women's National Hockey Team, Olympic Gold Medalist.

See also
List of high schools in Ontario

References

External links
 Official School Website
 TDSB School Information Website
 50th Reunion Website
 List of Past Boys Wrestling Champions

Educational institutions established in 1966
Education in Etobicoke
High schools in Toronto
Schools in the TDSB
1966 establishments in Ontario